Michal Obročník (born 4 June 1991) is a Slovak professional footballer who currently plays for Petržalka.

Career

ViOn Zlaté Moravce
He made his debut for ViOn Zlaté Moravce against Ružomberok on 14 July 2012.

Slovan Liberec
In January 2014, Obročník came to Czech club Slovan Liberec.

Pohronie
On 31 January 2020, Pohronie has announced that signing of Obročník, along with the signing of Jacy. In a later interview, Obročník explained that his early departure from Polish Chojniczanka Chojnice was caused by club's financial troubles and delayed wage payments. He returned to Slovakia as the contract with Chojniczanka forbade him from signing with another Polish club.

Obročník made his debut in the Fortuna Liga in the first round of the spring half of the season. On 15 February 2020, at pod Zoborom, Obročník was fielded in the starting line-up of a goal-less tie against Nitra. Despite making a couple of minor erroneous decisions in the play, particularly during the first half, he completed the entirety of the match.

On 8 March 2020, in an away fixture against Zemplín Michalovce (0:1 loss), Obročník had suffered a leg injury and had to be replaced by Richard Župa in the first half. The injury had ruled him out of play for just one game of the relegation group fixtures, as the season was delayed and shortened due to the coronavirus pandemic. However he remained benched all the remaining games of the season.

After the season, Obročník had departed from Pohronie, recording a total of four appearances. However, he resigned later during the autumn of 2020 and recorded 8 further appearances in the 2020–21 season before being released again in January 2021.

External links
Eurofotbal.cz profile
Ligy.sk profile

References

1991 births
Living people
Sportspeople from Rimavská Sobota
Slovak footballers
Slovak expatriate footballers
Association football midfielders
MŠK Rimavská Sobota players
FC ViOn Zlaté Moravce players
FC Slovan Liberec players
SK Sigma Olomouc players
FK Železiarne Podbrezová players
Chojniczanka Chojnice players
FK Pohronie players
FC Petržalka players
Slovak Super Liga players
2. Liga (Slovakia) players
Czech First League players
I liga players
Slovak expatriate sportspeople in the Czech Republic
Slovak expatriate sportspeople in Poland
Expatriate footballers in the Czech Republic
Expatriate footballers in Poland